David Santamaria (born December 15, 1990) is an American soccer player who currently plays for Miami United F.C. of the National Premier Soccer League.

Career

Youth
Santamaria grew up in Miami, Florida, attended Miami Sunset Senior High School, and played for the youth academy of former USL First Division side Miami FC, before going on to play one season of college soccer at Jacksonville University.

Professional
Santamaria turned professional immediately following his freshman college year, and after impressing team owners during the 2010 Traffic combine signed with Fort Lauderdale Strikers of the North American Soccer League. He made his professional debut - and scored his first professional goal - on May 11 in a 4-2 loss to the Carolina RailHawks.

After just one season with the Strikers, Santamaria joined the Atlanta Silverbacks on a season-long loan.  On August 8, 2012, the Santamaria and the Silverbacks agreed to terminate the loan agreement after appearing in seven matches and scoring one goal.

Santamaria traveled in September 2012 to Europe to open up his horizons.  He spent 2 months training and playing practice matches with the Portuguese club Sporting Clube de Pombal Following that experience, Santamaria traveled for a trial with the Serbian Superliga first division club FK Sloboda Uzice, after spending a month with the club Santamaria turned down an agreement which did not meet his expectations.

In December 2013, Santamaria signed with the Mexican side second division club Cimarrones de Sonora where he played Clausura 2014.

References

External links
 Fort Lauderdale bio
 Jacksonville profile

1990 births
Living people
American soccer players
Jacksonville Dolphins men's soccer players
Fort Lauderdale Strikers players
Atlanta Silverbacks players
Des Moines Menace players
FC Miami City players
North American Soccer League players
USL League Two players
National Premier Soccer League players
Soccer players from Florida
Association football forwards